Identity Card is a 2010 Czech comedy film by Ondřej Trojan based on a story by Petr Šabach. The film premiered on 21 October 2010.

The story, which takes place in Prague in the years 1974–77, tells about a group of fellow students: Peter (Petr), Cinderella (Popelka), Ales (Aleš) and Mita (Míťa). The film begins when Peter receives his identity card on his fifteenth birthday.

References

External links
 
 Občanský průkaz at CSFD.cz 
 Občanský průkaz at cfn.cz 

2010 films
2010s Czech-language films
2010 comedy films
Films set in the 1970s
Czech Film Critics' Awards winners
Czech comedy films